The Mafia Kills Only in Summer is a 2013 Italian comedy-drama film. It marked the directorial debut of the TV satirist Pif. The Italian Senate President and former anti-mafia magistrate Pietro Grasso referred to this film as the best film work on Sicilian Mafia ever made.

The film premiered at the 2013 Torino Film Festival and released to theatres in Italy on 28 November 2013. It was awarded best comedy film at the 27th European Film Awards.

Plot 
The story takes place in Palermo and it follows the story of the young Arturo Giammarresi, who wishes to become a journalist and has loved Flora since he was ten years old. His awkward attempts to conquer her heart run parallel to his (and his city's) slow realisation of the existence of Cosa Nostra. In the end, the movie is mostly a homage paid to the policemen and the magistrates who fought and gave their lives between the late 1970s and 1992, heroes of legality that were martyred in the attempt to dismantle the Sicilian Mafia.

Cast 
 Pif as Arturo (adult)
 Cristiana Capotondi as Flora (adult)
 Claudio Gioè as Francesco
 Ninni Bruschetta as Fra Giacinto
 Alex Bisconti as Arturo (child)
 Ginevra Antona as Flora (child)
 Maurizio Marchetti as Jean Pierre
 Barbara Tabita as Arturo's mother

See also   
 List of Italian films of 2013
 The Mafia Kills Only in Summer (TV series)

References

External links
 Official website 

2013 films
European Film Awards winners (films)
Italian comedy-drama films
Films set in Palermo
Films shot in Italy
Films about the Sicilian Mafia
2013 comedy-drama films
2013 directorial debut films
2010s Italian-language films